The San Rafael Stakes was an American Thoroughbred horse race run at Santa Anita Park, located in Arcadia, California. The race was a Grade III event with a purse of $150,000 and was open to three-year-olds willing to race one mile (8 furlongs) on the facility's dirt race track.

Prior to 2005, the race was held in early March. Beginning in 2005, the race was moved to mid-January to offer a better fit to trainers to race in the Sham Stakes, the Robert B. Lewis Stakes (formerly known as the Santa Catalina Stakes) and the San Felipe Stakes. It became the year's first official prep race for the U.S. Triple Crown series.  However, after Conveyance's win in 2010, Santa Anita has stopped running this event.

On November 28, 2007, this Grade II stakes race was downgraded to a Grade III by the American Graded Stakes Committee.

Records
Speed record:
 1:33.37 - El Gato Malo (2008) (On Cushion Track)
 1:34.40 - Prince Spellbound (1982) (on dirt)

Most wins by a jockey:
 5 - Chris McCarron (1983, 1984, 1986, 1991, 2002)
 5 - Gary Stevens (1988, 1989, 1990, 1996, 2005)

Most wins by a trainer:
 2 - Laz S. Barrera (1985, 1990)
 2 - Craig A. Lewis (1989, 1995)
 2 - Neil Drysdale (1992, 2000)
 2 - D. Wayne Lukas (1994, 1996)
 2 - Wallace Dollase (1998, 1999)

Most wins by an owner:
 2 - Thoroughbred Corp. (1998, 1999)

Winners of the San Rafael Stakes

References
 The San Rafael Stakes at Pedigree Query
 Thoroughbred Times article on the 2008 San Rafael Stakes titled El Gato Malo streaks to record-setting San Rafael win

Horse races in California
Santa Anita Park
Flat horse races for three-year-olds
Triple Crown Prep Races
Graded stakes races in the United States
Recurring sporting events established in 1981
1981 establishments in California